The 2nd Criterium of Polish Speedway League Aces was the 1983 version of the Criterium of Polish Speedway Leagues Aces. It took place on March 27 in the Polonia Stadium in Bydgoszcz, Poland.

Final standings

Sources 
 Roman Lach - Polish Speedway Almanac

See also 

Criterium of Aces
Criterium of Aces
1983